Giulio Monterenzi (died 23 May 1623) was a Roman Catholic prelate who served as Bishop of Faenza (1618–1623).

Biography
On 1 October 1618, Giulio Monterenzi was appointed during the papacy of Pope Paul V as Bishop of Faenza.
On 7 October 1618, he was consecrated bishop by Giovanni Garzia Mellini, Cardinal-Priest of Santi Quattro Coronati, with Ulpiano Volpi, Archbishop Emeritus of Chieti, and Francesco Sacrati (cardinal), Titular Archbishop of Damascus, serving as co-consecrators. 
He served as Bishop of Faenza until his death on 23 May 1623.

References

External links and additional sources
 (for Chronology of Bishops) 
 (for Chronology of Bishops)  

17th-century Italian Roman Catholic bishops
Bishops appointed by Pope Paul V
1623 deaths